Povilas Plechavičius (February 1, 1890 – December 19, 1973) was an Imperial Russian and then Lithuanian military officer and statesman. In the service of Lithuania he rose to the rank of General of the army in the interwar period. He is best known for his actions during the Lithuanian Wars of Independence, for organizing the 1926 Lithuanian coup d'état and for leading a Lithuanian collaborationist militia during the German occupation of Lithuania.

Early life
Povilas Plechavičius was born on February 1, 1890, in Židikai District to Lithuanian farmer Ignas Plechavičius. His mother was Lithuanian noblewoman  Konstancija Bukontaitė. In 1908, he graduated from a gymnasium in Moscow, in 1911 from Institute of Commerce.

During World War I
In 1914, Povilas Plechavičius graduated from the Orenburg cavalry war school. During World War I he fought with the Russian army against the German Empire, Austria-Hungary and the Ottoman Empire. During the war, he was wounded three times. In October 1917, he and his brother, Aleksandras, were on the southern Front against the Ottomans. On news of the outbreak of the Lithuanian–Soviet War, both of them illegally left their regiments for Samogitia.

Lithuanian Wars of Independence

Plechavičius and his brother returned to their homeland in the summer of 1918 and began organizing local partisan battalion together with his brother, Aleksandras. The weapons for the unit were obtained from Germans in Latvia. Being skilled at military organization, and together with his brother, and with the support of the local population they succeeded in creating volunteer partisan units to fight against the Bolshevik invasion of North-West Lithuania, and later helped to drive out the Bermontians. His battalion drove out Bolsheviks from Seda, Mažeikiai and Telšiai and their surroundings. Plechavičius was assigned military commander of Skuodas and its surroundings by the Lithuanian Council. On 13 November 1918, after successfully fighting the Bolsheviks and Bermontians, Plechavičius enlisted as a volunteer to the Lithuanian army.

As an officer in the Lithuanian Army he participated in the Polish-Lithuanian war in the battles for Seinai, Augustavas and Varėna. For his accomplishments in the Lithuanian Wars of Independence in defending Lithuania from invaders, Plechavičius was awarded the highest military Order of Lithuania - the Order of Vytis Cross. He served in various cavalry squadrons and became the colonel of the Hussar regiment in 1922. Later he was the main officer behind the military coup of 1926, that removed the democratically elected government, assumed power and then handed it to Antanas Smetona.

From August 1927, he was the Chief of the General Staff. He was given the rank of lieutenant general in 1929.

Lithuanian Territorial Defense Force

During the first Soviet occupation Plechavičius returned to Lithuania with the Nazis during Operation Barbarossa. In 1943, the Nazi occupational government failed to gather a Lithuanian SS unit due to opposition to the Nazi occupation and thus their project from all parts of society. Plechavičius began forming the Lithuanian Territorial Defense Force (Lietuvos vietinė rinktinė), on February 13, 1944. It was a volunteer military unit led only by Lithuanian officers and supposed to stay with the borders of Lithuania to defend the country against the Red Army.

Three days later, on Lithuanian Independence Day (February 16, 1944) Plechavičius, the commander of the Lithuanian detachment, made a radio appeal to the nation for volunteers. Some 19,500 men responded to the appeal. All Lithuanian political underground organizations supported Plechavičius. This was achieved through constant communication between Lithuanian commanders and resistance leaders. This was enormously successful: more volunteers came forward than was expected. The Germans were very surprised and deeply shocked by the number of volunteers since their own appeals went unheeded. 

On March 22, 1944, SS Obergruppenführer and police general Friedrich Jeckeln called for 70–80,000 men for the German army as subsidiary assistants. Chief-of-Staff of the Northern Front Field Marshal Walther Model demanded 15 battalions of men to protect the German military airports. Plechavičius rejected the demand on April 5, 1944. General Commissioner of Lithuania Adrian von Renteln demanded workers for Germany proper. Other German officials also voiced their demands. Finally, on April 6, 1944, the Germans ordered Plechavičius to mobilize the country. Plechavičius responded that the mobilization could not take place until the formation of the detachment was complete.

After the failed offensive against Polish Armia Krajowa due to the pre–emptive Polish surprise attack, Jeckeln ordered the detachment units in Vilnius to revert to his direct authority. All other units of the detachment were to come under the command of the regional German commissars. Furthermore, the detachment was to use the "Heil Hitler" greeting.

Plechavičius issued a declaration for his men to disband and disappear into the forests with their weapons and uniforms. The Lithuanian headquarters directed the detachment units in the field to obey only the orders of the Lithuanian detachment. It also ordered the Detachment Officer School in the city of Marijampolė to send the cadets home. The LTDF disbanded itself, with a majority of its soldiers becoming part of the underground resistance and forming the core of the armed anti-Soviet resistance in Lithuania for the next eight years. On May 15, Plechavičius, the commander of the detachment, was arrested together with the other staff members. He was deported to the Salaspils concentration camp in Latvia. After some time, he was released and he escaped to the West in July 1944.

After the Second World War
Plechavičius moved to the United States in 1949, where his sister and mother lived. He died on December 19, 1973, in Chicago, Illinois, and was buried at Saint Casimir Catholic Cemetery.

In 2004 Plechavičius was posthumously awarded a medal from Lithuanian president Rolandas Paksas for his services to Lithuania.

References

Further reading
 

1890 births
1973 deaths
Russian military personnel of World War I
Lithuanian anti-communists
Lithuanian military personnel
Lithuanian generals
Lithuanian collaborators with Nazi Germany
People from Kovno Governorate
People from Mažeikiai District Municipality
Recipients of the Order of the Cross of Vytis